The 1978 Campeonato Paulista da Divisão Especial de Futebol Profissional was the 77th season of São Paulo's top professional football league. Santos won the championship by the 14th time. Paulista and Portuguesa Santista were relegated.

Championship
The first phase of the championship was divided into two rounds, in which the twenty teams of the championship were divided into four groups of five teams, with each team playing once against all other teams, and the two best teams of each group passing to the Quarterfinals. The finalists of each round qualified to the Third round, along with the four best teams in the aggregate table, and the two teams with the best revenue among the eliminated. the team with the fewest points out of all the twenty was relegated, while the team with the second-fewest points would dispute a playoff against the runner-up of the Second level. 

In the Third round, the ten remaining teams would be divided into two groups of five, each team playing once against the teams of its own group and the other group, and the two best teams of each group qualifying to the Semifinals.

First round

Group A

Group B

Group C

Group D

Quarterfinals

|}

Semifinals

|}

Finals

|}

Second round

Group A

Group B

Group C

Group D

Quarterfinals

|}

Semifinals

|}

Finals

|}

Aggregate table

Relegation Playoffs

|}

Third round

Group A

Group B

Semifinals

|}

Finals

|}

Top Scores

References

Campeonato Paulista seasons
Paulista